The Torres Strait Islander Flag is an official flag of Australia, and is the flag that represents Torres Strait Islander people. It was designed in 1992 by Bernard Namok. It won a local competition held by the Islands Coordinating Council, and was recognised by the Aboriginal and Torres Strait Islander Commission in June 1992.

Status 
The Government of Australia granted it Flag of Australia status, under the Flags Act 1953 (Cth), by proclamation on 14 July 1995.

Due to an "administrative oversight", the 1995 proclamation was not lodged so that it would continue in force indefinitely;  hence it automatically expired on 1 January 2008. It was therefore almost identically replaced, on 25 January 2008, with effect as from 1 January.

In the 2008 proclamation, the flag "is recognised as the flag of the Torres Strait Islander people of Australia and a flag of significance to the Australian nation generally" and appointed "to be the flag of the Torres Strait Islander people of Australia and to be known as the Torres Strait Islander Flag".  The design is reproduced in Schedule 1 and described in Schedule 2.

Although Namok has since died, the Torres Strait Islander Flag is still subject to copyright under the Copyright Act 1968 (Cth). The copyright was administered by the Island Coordinating Council until 2008, when that body was superseded by the Torres Strait Island Regional Council, which is willing to permit reproductions of the flag that are accurate and that acknowledge Namok as the designer.

Colours 
The official colours of the flag of the Torres Strait Islanders are as follows:

Symbolic meaning 

The green panels at the top and the bottom of the flag symbolise the land, while the blue panel in the centre represents the waters of the Torres Strait. The thin black stripes between the green and blue panels signify the Torres Strait Islanders themselves. The white five-pointed star at the centre of the flag represents the five major island groupsthe Western, Eastern, Central, Port Kennedy and (N.P.A.) Mainlandand the white dhari (also spelt dari, a ceremonial dancer's headdress), around it also symbolises the Torres Strait Islands people. White symbolises peace, while the star is a symbol for navigation.

Public display

The Torres Strait Islander flag is permanently flown alongside the Aboriginal flag in front of Adelaide Town Hall in Adelaide, South Australia.

Following the 2022 Australian federal election on 21 May 2022, the incoming Anthony Albanese-led Labor government started displaying the Aboriginal flag and the Torres Strait Islander flag alongside the national flag at ministerial press conferences.  Upon the opening of the new Parliament, both flags began to be displayed in the House of Representatives and Senate chambers.

From 27 May 2022, at the start of National Reconciliation Week, both the Aboriginal and Torres Strait Islander flags were hoisted on the front lawn of Government House, Adelaide, to be permanently flown alongside the national flag and the South Australian flag.

Local flags

See also

Flags of Australia
Aboriginal Flag
Ethnic flag

References

Further reading

Torres Strait Islander flag (AIATSIS)

External links 

 

Flags of Australia
Torres Strait Islanders
Flags introduced in 1992
Flags of indigenous peoples
1995 establishments in Australia